A radio net is three or more radio stations communicating with each other on a common channel or frequency.  A net is essentially a moderated conference call conducted over two-way radio, typically in half-duplex operating conditions. The use of half-duplex operation requires a very particular set of operating procedures to be followed in order to avoid inefficiencies and chaos.

Nets operate either on schedule or continuously (continuous watch). Nets operating on schedule handle traffic only at definite, prearranged times and in accordance with a prearranged schedule of intercommunication. Nets operating continuously are prepared to handle traffic at any time; they maintain operators on duty at all stations in the net at all times. When practicable, messages relating to schedules will be transmitted by a means of signal communication other than radio.

Net operations:
 allow participants to conduct ordered conferences among participants who usually have common information needs or related functions to perform
 are characterized by adherence to standard formats and procedures, and
 are responsive to a common supervisory station, called the "net control station", which permits access to the net and maintains net operational discipline.

Net manager 
A net manager is the person who supervises the creation and operation of a net over multiple sessions. This person will specify the format, date, time, participants, and the net control script. The net manager will also choose the Net Control Station for each net, and may occasionally take on that function, especially in smaller organizations.

Net Control Station 
Radio nets are like conference calls in that both have a moderator who initiates the group communication, who ensures all participants follow the standard procedures, and who determines and directs when each other station may talk. The moderator in a radio net is called the Net Control Station, formally abbreviated NCS, and has the following duties:
 Establishes the net and closes the net;
 Directs Net activities, such as passing traffic, to maintain optimum efficiency;
 Chooses net frequency, maintains circuit discipline and frequency accuracy;
 Maintains a net log and records participation in the net and movement of messages; (always knows who is on and off net)
 Appoints one or more Alternate Net Control Stations (ANCS);
 Determines whether and when to conduct network continuity checks;
 Determines when full procedure and full call signs may enhance communications;
 Subject to Net Manager guidance, directs a net to be directed or free.
The Net Control Station will, for each net, appoint at least one Alternate Net Control Station, formally abbreviated ANCS (abbreviated NC2 in WWII procedures), who has the following duties:
 Assists the NCS to maintain optimum efficiency;
 Assumes NCS duties in event that the NCS develops station problems;
 Assumes NCS duties for a portion of the net, as directed or as needed;
 Serves as a resource for the NCS; echoes transmissions of the NCS if, and only if, directed to do so by the NCS;
 Maintains a duplicate net log

Structure of the net 
Nets can be described as always having a net opening and a net closing, with a roll call normally following the net opening, itself followed by regular net business, which may include announcements, official business, and message passing. Military nets will follow a very abbreviated and opaque version of the structure outlined below, but will still have the critical elements of opening, roll call, late check-ins, and closing.

A net should always operate on the same principle as the inverted pyramid used in journalism—the most important communications always come first, followed by content in ever lower levels of priority.
 Net opening
 Identification of the NCS
 Announcement of the regular date, time, and frequency of the net
 Purpose of the net
 Roll call
 A call for stations to check in, oftentimes from a roster of regular stations
 A call for late check-ins (stations on the roster who did not respond to the first check-in period)
 A call for guest stations to check in
 Net business
 Optional conversion to a free net
 Net closing
Each net will typically have a main purpose, which varies according to the organization conducting the net, which occurs during the net business phase. For amateur radio nets, it's typically for the purpose of allowing stations to discuss their recent operating activities (stations worked, antennas built, etc.) or to swap equipment. For Military Auxiliary Radio System and National Traffic System nets, net business will involve mainly the passing of formal messages, known as radiograms.

Two modes of net operation 
 Directed Net
 A net in which no station other than the net control station can communicate with any other station, except for the transmission of urgent messages, without first obtaining the permission of the net control station.
 Free net
 A net in which any station may communicate with any other station in the same net without first obtaining permission from the net control station to do so.

Net-control procedure words 
U.S. Army Field Manual ACP 125(G) has the most complete set of procedure words used in radio nets:

Types of radio nets 
Maritime mobile nets serve the needs of seagoing vessels.

Civil Air Patrol nets 
The Civil Air Patrol defines a different set of nets:

Amateur radio nets 
The International Amateur Radio Union defines six different types of nets in its IARU Emergency Telecommunications Guide:

Other Amateur radio net types

U.S. Military radio nets 
The U.S. Army Field Manual FM 6-02.53, Tactical Radio Operations, defines the following types of radio nets:

Maritime radio nets 

When boats or ships are in distress, they will operate a maritime broadcast communications net to communicate among the vessel in distress and all the other vessels, aircraft, and shore stations assisting in the distress response.

See also 
 Amateur radio net

References

External links
 

Telecommunications